A part song, part-song or partsong is a form of choral music that consists of a song to a secular or non-liturgical sacred text, written or arranged for several vocal parts. Part songs are commonly sung by an SATB choir, but sometimes for an all-male or all-female ensemble. This music is usually homophonic, meaning that the highest part carries the melody and the other voices or parts supply the accompanying harmonies, in contrast to songs that are contrapuntal, as are madrigals. Part songs are intended to be sung a cappella, that is without accompaniment, unless an instrumental accompaniment is particularly specified.

The part song was created in Great Britain, first growing from, and then gradually superseding, the earlier form of glee, as well as being particularly influenced by the choral works of Felix Mendelssohn (1809–1847). This was linked with the growth of choral societies during the 19th century which were larger groups than glee clubs had been.

Early British composers of part songs include John Liptrot Hatton, R. J. S. Stevens, Henry Smart and George Alexander Macfarren, who was renowned for his Shakespearean settings. Around the turn of the 20th century in the heyday of the part song, Hubert Parry, Charles Villiers Stanford and Edward Elgar were the principal exponents, often bringing a high-minded seriousness to their settings of great English poetry both contemporary and from earlier epochs. More recent major contributors to the genre include Ralph Vaughan Williams, Granville Bantock, Arnold Bax, Peter Warlock, Gustav Holst and Benjamin Britten. The development of the part song has been marked by increasing complexity of form, and contrapuntal content.

Composers have also successfully used the part song medium to make contemporary arrangements of traditional folk songs, including those of Scotland, England, Wales and Ireland.

In Ukraine partsong replaced a Znamenny chant. About half a century before the advent of party part song, the old hook notation began to be replaced by a non-linear one, close to the modern one. Orthodox fraternities initiated the introduction of party singing. They opened schools at monasteries and introduced the study of part song in fraternal and church choirs. The first mention of such a study is associated with the Lviv Stauropean Brotherhood and dates back to the 1590s. The theoretical foundations of part song have been set out in a number of treatises. The most famous of them and the only surviving (in several editions) - "Musical Grammar" by Mykola Diletsky.

According to the number of voices and the nature of polyphony, part songs are divided into three groups: party concerts, party motets and party works with constant polyphony. Party concerts include all works with 8 or more voices, and motets include party works of variable polyphony with 6 or less voices. Seven-part works have not yet been found, so they are not included in this classification, but most likely they must also be included in concerts. According to the themes of the texts and the predominant musical means, the part songs are divided into two large groups: vivatno-panegyric (glorious) and lyrical-dramatic (repentant).

Examples

 Ye spotted snakes, text by Shakespeare, music by R. J. S. Stevens
 Orpheus with his lute, text by Shakespeare, music by George MacFarren
 The Long Day Closes, rext by Henry Chorley, music by Arthur Sullivan
 Lay a garland, music by Robert Lucas de Pearsall
 O wild west wind, text by Shelley, music by Edward Elgar
 Three Shakespeare Songs – text by Shakespeare, music by Vaughan Williams
 Loch Lomond, traditional Scottish songs, arranged by Vaughan Williams
 Five Flower Songs, texts by four authors, music by Benjamin Britten

References

Song forms